Robert Hay (10 May 1897 – 11 August 1968) was a Canadian rower. He competed in the men's coxed four event at the 1920 Summer Olympics.

References

External links
 

1897 births
1968 deaths
Canadian male rowers
Olympic rowers of Canada
Rowers at the 1920 Summer Olympics
Rowers from Toronto